Mononegavirales is an order of negative-strand RNA viruses which have nonsegmented genomes. Some common members of the order are Ebola virus, human respiratory syncytial virus, measles virus, mumps virus, Nipah virus, and rabies virus. All of these viruses cause significant disease in humans. Many other important pathogens of nonhuman animals and plants are also in the group. The order includes eleven virus families: Artoviridae, Bornaviridae, Filoviridae, Lispiviridae, Mymonaviridae, Nyamiviridae, Paramyxoviridae, Pneumoviridae, Rhabdoviridae, Sunviridae, and Xinmoviridae.

Use of term
The order Mononegavirales  is a virological taxon that was created in 1991 and amended in 1995, 1997, 2000, 2005, 2011, 2016, 2017, and 2018. The name Mononegavirales is derived from the Ancient Greek adjective μóνος monos (alluding to the monopartite and single-stranded genomes of most mononegaviruses), the Latin verb negare (alluding to the negative polarity of these genomes), and the taxonomic suffix -virales (denoting a viral order).

Order inclusion criteria

A virus is a member of the order Mononegavirales if
 its genome is a linear, typically (but not always) nonsegmented, single-stranded, non-infectious RNA of negative polarity; possesses inverse-complementary 3' and 5' termini; and is not covalently linked to a protein;
 its genome has the characteristic gene order 3'-UTR–core protein genes–envelope protein genes–RNA-dependent RNA polymerase gene–5'-UTR (3'-N-P-M-G-L-5') (there are, however, some exceptions);
 it produces 5–10 distinct mRNAs from its genome via polar sequential transcription from a single promoter located at the 3' end of the genome; mRNAs are 5' capped and polyadenylated;
 it replicates by synthesizing complete antigenomes;
 it forms infectious helical ribonucleocapsids as the templates for the synthesis of mRNAs, antigenomes, and genomes;
 it encodes an RNA-dependent RNA polymerase (RdRp, L) that is highly homologous to those of other mononegaviruses; and/or
 it typically (but not always) produces enveloped virions with a molecular mass of 300–1,000; an S20W of 550–>1,045; and a buoyant density in CsCl of 1.18–1.22 g/cm3.

Life cycle

The mononegavirus life cycle begins with virion attachment to specific cell-surface receptors, followed by fusion of the virion envelope with cellular membranes and the concomitant release of the virus nucleocapsid into the cytosol. The virus RdRp partially uncoats the nucleocapsid and transcribes the genes into positive-stranded mRNAs, which are then translated into structural and nonstructural proteins.

Mononegavirus RdRps bind to a single promoter located at the 3' end of the genome. Transcription either terminates after a gene or continues to the next gene downstream. This means that genes close to the 3' end of the genome are transcribed in the greatest abundance, whereas those toward the 5' end are least likely to be transcribed. The gene order is therefore a simple but effective form of transcriptional regulation. The most abundant protein produced is the nucleoprotein, whose concentration in the cell determines when the RdRp switches from gene transcription to genome replication.

Replication results in full-length, positive-stranded antigenomes that are in turn transcribed into negative-stranded virus progeny genome copies. Newly synthesized structural proteins and genomes self-assemble and accumulate near the inside of the cell membrane. Virions bud off from the cell, gaining their envelopes from the cellular membrane they bud from. The mature progeny particles then infect other cells to repeat the cycle.

Paleovirology

Mononegaviruses have a history that dates back several tens of million of years. Mononegavirus "fossils" have been discovered in the form of mononegavirus genes or gene fragments integrated into mammalian genomes. For instance, bornavirus gene "fossils" have been detected in the genomes of bats, fish, hyraxes, marsupials, primates, rodents, ruminants, and elephants. Filovirus gene "fossils" have been detected in the genomes of bats, rodents, shrews, tenrecs, and marsupials. A Midway virus "fossil" was found in the genome of zebrafish. Finally, rhabdovirus "fossils" were found in the genomes of crustaceans, mosquitoes, ticks, and plants.

Taxonomy

The order has eleven families that include numerous genera, which consist of many different species:

 Artoviridae
 Bornaviridae
 Filoviridae
 Lispiviridae
 Mymonaviridae
 Nyamiviridae
 Paramyxoviridae
 Pneumoviridae
 Rhabdoviridae
 Sunviridae
 Xinmoviridae

Table of the order showing all families, genera, species, and their viruses:

Table legend: "*" denotes type species.

Notes

References

External links
 International Committee on Taxonomy of Viruses (ICTV)

 
Animal viral diseases
Viral plant pathogens and diseases
Zoonoses
Virus orders